Bruce Stanton Taafe (13 August 1944 – 29 April 2018) was a rugby union player who represented Australia.

Taafe, a hooker, was born in Melbourne, Victoria and claimed a total of 3 international rugby caps for Australia.

References

Australian rugby union players
Australia international rugby union players
1944 births
2018 deaths
Rugby union players from Melbourne
Rugby union hookers